Karelrybflot AO v Udovenko [2000] 2 NZLR 24 is a cited case in New Zealand confirming that the doctrine of frustration can cover employment contracts.

References

New Zealand contract case law
1999 in New Zealand law
Court of Appeal of New Zealand cases
1999 in case law